

Events

Pre-1600
452 or 453 – Severianus, Bishop of Scythopolis, is martyred in Palestine.
1245 – Thomas, the first known Bishop of Finland, is granted resignation after confessing to torture and forgery.
1440 – The Prussian Confederation is formed.

1601–1900
1613 – Mikhail I is unanimously elected Tsar by a national assembly, beginning the Romanov dynasty of Imperial Russia.
1797 – A force of 1,400 French soldiers invaded Britain at Fishguard in support of the Society of United Irishmen. They were defeated by 500 British reservists.
1804 – The first self-propelling steam locomotive makes its outing at the Pen-y-Darren Ironworks in Wales.
1808 – Without a previous declaration of war, Russian troops cross the border to Sweden at Abborfors in eastern Finland, thus beginning the Finnish War, in which Sweden will lose the eastern half of the country (i.e. Finland) to Russia.
1828 – Initial issue of the Cherokee Phoenix is the first periodical to use the Cherokee syllabary invented by Sequoyah.
1842 – John Greenough is granted the first U.S. patent for the sewing machine.
1848 – Karl Marx and Friedrich Engels publish The Communist Manifesto.
1862 – American Civil War: Battle of Valverde is fought near Fort Craig in New Mexico Territory.
1874 – The Oakland Daily Tribune publishes its first edition.
1878 – The first telephone directory is issued in New Haven, Connecticut.
1885 – The newly completed Washington Monument is dedicated.
1896 – An Englishman raised in Australia, Bob Fitzsimmons, fought an Irishman, Peter Maher, in an American promoted event which technically took place in Mexico, winning the 1896 World Heavyweight Championship in boxing.

1901–present
1913 – Ioannina is incorporated into the Greek state after the Balkan Wars.
1916 – World War I: In France, the Battle of Verdun begins.
1918 – The last Carolina parakeet dies in captivity at the Cincinnati Zoo.
1919 – German socialist Kurt Eisner is assassinated. His death results in the establishment of the Bavarian Soviet Republic and parliament and government fleeing Munich, Germany.
1921 – Constituent Assembly of the Democratic Republic of Georgia adopts the country's first constitution.
  1921   – Rezā Shāh takes control of Tehran during a successful coup.
1925 – The New Yorker publishes its first issue.
1929 – In the first battle of the Warlord Rebellion in northeastern Shandong against the Nationalist government of China, a 24,000-strong rebel force led by Zhang Zongchang was defeated at Zhifu by 7,000 NRA troops.
1937 – The League of Nations bans foreign national "volunteers" in the Spanish Civil War.
  1945   – World War II:  the Brazilian Expeditionary Force defeat the German forces in the Battle of Monte Castello on the Italian front.
1947 – In New York City, Edwin Land demonstrates the first "instant camera", the Polaroid Land Camera, to a meeting of the Optical Society of America.
1948 – NASCAR is incorporated.
1952 – The British government, under Winston Churchill, abolishes identity cards in the UK to "set the people free".
  1952   – The Bengali Language Movement protests occur at the University of Dhaka in East Pakistan (now Bangladesh).
1958 – The CND symbol, aka peace symbol, commissioned by the Direct Action Committee in protest against the Atomic Weapons Research Establishment, is designed and completed by Gerald Holtom.
1971 – The Convention on Psychotropic Substances is signed at Vienna.
1972 – United States President Richard Nixon visits China to normalize Sino-American relations.
  1972   – The Soviet unmanned spaceship Luna 20 lands on the Moon.
1973 – Over the Sinai Desert, Israeli fighter aircraft shoot down Libyan Arab Airlines Flight 114 jet killing 108 people.
1974 – The last Israeli soldiers leave the west bank of the Suez Canal pursuant to a truce with Egypt.
1975 – Watergate scandal: Former United States Attorney General John N. Mitchell and former White House aides H. R. Haldeman and John Ehrlichman are sentenced to prison.
1994 – Aldrich Ames is arrested by the Federal Bureau of Investigation for selling national secrets to the Soviet Union in Arlington County, Virginia.
1995 – Steve Fossett lands in Leader, Saskatchewan, Canada becoming the first person to make a solo flight across the Pacific Ocean in a balloon.
2013 – At least 17 people are killed and 119 injured following several bombings in the Indian city of Hyderabad.
2022 – In the  Russo-Ukrainian crisis Russian President Vladimir Putin declares the Luhansk People's Republic and Donetsk People's Republic as independent from Ukraine, and moves troops into the region. The action is condemned by the United Nations.

Births

Pre-1600
 921 – Abe no Seimei, Japanese astrologer (d. 1005)
1397 – Isabella of Portugal (d. 1471)
1462 – Joanna la Beltraneja, princess of Castile (d. 1530)
1484 – Joachim I Nestor, Elector of Brandenburg (d. 1535)
1498 – Ralph Neville, 4th Earl of Westmorland, English Earl (d. 1549)
1541 – Philipp V, Count of Hanau-Lichtenberg (d. 1599)
1556 – Sethus Calvisius, German astronomer, composer, and theorist (d. 1615)

1601–1900
1609 – Raimondo Montecuccoli, Italian military commander (d. 1680)
1621 – Rebecca Nurse, Massachusetts colonist, executed as a witch (d. 1692)
1705 – Edward Hawke, 1st Baron Hawke, English admiral and politician (d. 1781)
1728 – Peter III of Russia (d. 1762)
1783 – Catharina of Württemberg (d. 1835)
1788 – Francis Ronalds, British scientist, inventor and engineer who was knighted for developing the first working electric telegraph (d. 1873)
1791 – Carl Czerny, Austrian pianist and composer (d. 1857)
1794 – Antonio López de Santa Anna, Mexican general and politician, 8th President of Mexico (d. 1876)
1801 – John Henry Newman, English cardinal (d. 1890)
1817 – José Zorrilla, Spanish poet and playwright (d. 1893)
1821 – Charles Scribner I, American publisher, founded Charles Scribner's Sons (d. 1871)
1836 – Léo Delibes, French pianist and composer (d. 1891)
1844 – Charles-Marie Widor, French organist and composer (d. 1937)
1860 – Goscombe John, Welsh-English sculptor and academic (d. 1952)
1865 – John Haden Badley, English author and educator, founded the Bedales School (d. 1967)
1867 – Otto Hermann Kahn, German banker and philanthropist (d. 1934)
1875 – Jeanne Calment, French super-centenarian, oldest verified person ever (d. 1997)
1878 – Mirra Alfassa, French-Indian spiritual leader (d. 1973)
1881 – Kenneth J. Alford, English soldier, bandmaster, and composer (d. 1945)
1885 – Sacha Guitry, Russian-French actor, director, and playwright (d. 1957)
1887 – Korechika Anami, Japanese general and politician, 54th Japanese Minister of War (d. 1945)
1888 – Clemence Dane, English author and playwright (d. 1965)
1892 – Harry Stack Sullivan, American psychiatrist and psychoanalyst (d. 1949)
1893 – Celia Lovsky, Austrian-American actress (d. 1979)
  1893   – Andrés Segovia, Spanish guitarist (d. 1987)
1894 – Shanti Swaroop Bhatnagar, Indian chemist and academic (d. 1955)
1895 – Henrik Dam, Danish biochemist and physiologist, Nobel Prize laureate (d. 1976)
1896 – Nirala, Indian poet and author (d. 1961)
1900 – Jeanne Aubert, French singer and actress (d. 1988)

1901–present
1902 – Arthur Nock, English theologian and academic (d. 1963)
1903 – Anaïs Nin, French-American essayist and memoirist (d. 1977)
  1903   – Raymond Queneau, French poet and author (d. 1976)
1907 – W. H. Auden, British-American poet, playwright, and composer (d. 1973)
1909 – Hans Erni, Swiss painter, sculptor, and illustrator (d. 2015)
1910 – Douglas Bader, English captain and pilot (d. 1982)
1912 – Arline Judge, American actress and singer (d. 1974)
1914 – Ilmari Juutilainen, Finnish soldier and pilot (d. 1999)
  1914   – Zachary Scott, American actor (d. 1965)
  1914   – Jean Tatlock, American psychiatrist and physician (d. 1944)
1915 – Claudia Jones, Trinidad-British journalist and activist (d. 1964)
  1915   – Ann Sheridan, American actress and singer (d. 1967)
  1915   – Anton Vratuša, Prime Minister of Slovenia (d. 2017)
1917 – Lucille Bremer, American actress and dancer (d. 1996)
  1917   – Tadd Dameron, American pianist and composer (d. 1965)
1921 – John Rawls, American philosopher and academic (d. 2002)
  1921   – Richard T. Whitcomb, American aeronautical engineer (d. 2009)
1924 – Thelma Estrin, American computer scientist and engineer (d. 2014)
  1924   – Robert Mugabe, Zimbabwean educator and politician, 2nd President of Zimbabwe (d. 2019)
  1924   – Dorothy Blum, American computer scientist and cryptanalyst (d. 1980)
1925 – Sam Peckinpah, American director and screenwriter (d. 1984)
  1925   – Jack Ramsay, American basketball player, coach, and sportscaster (d. 2014)
1927 – Erma Bombeck, American journalist and author (d. 1996)
1929 – Chespirito, Mexican actor, director, producer, and screenwriter (d. 2014)
1933 – Bob Rafelson, American film director, producer, and screenwriter (d. 2022)
  1933   – Nina Simone, American singer-songwriter and pianist (d. 2003)
1934 – Rue McClanahan, American actress (d. 2010)
1935 – Richard A. Lupoff, American author (d. 2020)
  1935   – Mark McManus, Scottish actor (d. 1994)
1936 – Barbara Jordan, American lawyer and politician (d. 1996)
1937 – Ron Clarke, Australian runner and politician, Mayor of the Gold Coast (d. 2015)
  1937   – Harald V of Norway
1938 – Bobby Charles, American singer-songwriter (d. 2020)
  1938   – Kel Tremain, New Zealand rugby player (d. 1992)
1940 – Peter Gethin, English racing driver (d. 2011)
  1940   – John Lewis, American activist and politician (d. 2020)
1942 – Tony Martin, Trinidadian-American historian and academic (d. 2013)
  1942   – Margarethe von Trotta, German actress, director, and screenwriter
1943 – David Geffen, American businessman, co-founded DreamWorks and Geffen Records
1945 – Maurice Bembridge, English golfer
1946 – Tyne Daly, American actress and singer
  1946   – Anthony Daniels, English actor and producer
  1946   – Alan Rickman, English actor and director (d. 2016)
  1946   – Bob Ryan, American journalist and author
1947 – Johnny Echols, American singer-songwriter and guitarist 
  1947   – Olympia Snowe, American politician
1948 – Bill Slayback, American baseball player and singer (d. 2015)
1949 – Frank Brunner, American illustrator
  1949   – Jerry Harrison, American singer-songwriter, guitarist, and producer 
  1949   – Ronnie Hellström, Swedish footballer (d. 2022)
  1950   – Sahle-Work Zewde, Ethiopian president
1951 – Vince Welnick, American keyboard player (d. 2006)
1952 – Jean-Jacques Burnel, English bass player, songwriter, and producer
  1952   – Vitaly Churkin, Russian diplomat, former Ambassador of Russia to the United Nations (d. 2017)
1953 – William Petersen, American actor and producer 
1954 – Christina Rees, British politician
1955 – Kelsey Grammer, American actor, singer, and producer
1958 – Jake Burns, Northern Irish singer-songwriter and guitarist 
  1958   – Mary Chapin Carpenter, American singer-songwriter and guitarist
  1958   – Alan Trammell, American baseball player, coach, and manager
1959 – José María Cano, Spanish singer-songwriter and painter 
1960 – Plamen Oresharski, Bulgarian economist and politician, 52nd Prime Minister of Bulgaria
1961 – Christopher Atkins, American actor and businessman
  1961   – Elliot Hirshman, American psychologist and academic
1962 – Chuck Palahniuk, American novelist and journalist
  1962   – David Foster Wallace, American novelist, short story writer, and essayist (d. 2008)
1963 – William Baldwin, American actor
  1963   – Ranking Roger, English singer-songwriter and musician (d. 2019)
  1963   – Greg Turner, New Zealand golfer
1964 – Mark Kelly, United States Senator, American captain, pilot, and astronaut
  1964   – Scott Kelly, American captain, pilot, and astronaut
1965 – Mark Ferguson, Australian journalist
1967 – Leroy Burrell, American runner and coach
  1967   – Sari Essayah, Finnish athlete and politician
1969 – James Dean Bradfield, Welsh singer-songwriter and guitarist
  1969   – Aunjanue Ellis, American actress and producer
  1969   – Petra Kronberger, Austrian skier
  1969   – Tony Meola, American soccer player and manager
  1969   – Cathy Richardson, American singer-songwriter and guitarist 
1970 – Michael Slater, Australian cricketer and sportscaster
1971 – Pierre Fulke, Swedish golfer
1973 – Heri Joensen, Faroese singer-songwriter and guitarist 
  1973   – Brian Rolston, American ice hockey player and coach
1974 – Iván Campo, Spanish footballer
1975 – Scott Miller, Australian swimmer
1976 – Ryan Smyth, Canadian ice hockey player
  1976   – Michael McIntyre, English comedian, actor and television presenter
1977 – Steve Francis, American basketball player
  1977   – Rhiannon Giddens, American musician
1979 – Pascal Chimbonda, Guadeloupean-French footballer
  1979   – Jennifer Love Hewitt, American actress and producer
  1979   – Carly Colón, Puerto Rican professional wrestler
  1979   – Jordan Peele, American actor, producer, and screenwriter
1980 – Brad Fast, Canadian ice hockey player 
  1980   – Tiziano Ferro, Italian singer-songwriter and producer
  1980   – Jigme Khesar Namgyel Wangchuck, 5th King of Bhutan
1982 – Andre Barrett, American basketball player
  1982   – Chantal Claret, American singer-songwriter
  1982   – Tebogo Jacko Magubane, South African DJ and producer 
1983 – Braylon Edwards, American football player
  1983   – Franklin Gutiérrez, Venezuelan baseball player
  1983   – Mélanie Laurent, French actress
1984 – Andrew Ellis, New Zealand rugby player
  1984   – David Odonkor, German footballer
  1984   – Marco Paoloni, Italian footballer
  1984   – James Wisniewski, American ice hockey player
1985 – Georgios Samaras, Greek footballer
1986 – Charlotte Church, Welsh singer-songwriter and actress
1987 – Elliot Page, Canadian actor
1987 – Eniola Aluko, English footballer 
1989 – Corbin Bleu, American actor, model, dancer, film producer and singer-songwriter
1990 – Mattias Tedenby, Swedish ice hockey player
1991 – Joe Alwyn, English actor
  1991   – Riyad Mahrez, Algerian footballer
  1991   – Ji So-yun, South Korean footballer
  1991   – Devon Travis, American baseball player
1993 – Steve Leo Beleck, Cameroonian footballer
  1993   – Davy Klaassen, Dutch footballer
1994 – Tang Haochen, Chinese tennis player
  1994   – Shon Seung-wan, South Korean singer
1996 – Noah Rubin, American tennis player
  1996   – Sophie Turner, English actress
1999 – Metawin Opas-iamkajorn, Thai actor and singer

Deaths

Pre-1600
4 AD – Gaius Caesar, Roman consul and grandson of Augustus (b. 20 BC)
 675 – Randoald of Grandval, prior of the Benedictine monastery of Grandval
1184 – Minamoto no Yoshinaka, Japanese shōgun (b. 1154)
1267 – Baldwin of Ibelin, Seneschal of Cyprus
1437 – James I of Scotland (b. 1394; assassinated)
1471 – Jan Rokycana, Czech bishop and theologian (b. 1396)
1513 – Pope Julius II (b. 1443)
1543 – Ahmad ibn Ibrahim al-Ghazi, Somalian general (b. 1507)
1554 – Hieronymus Bock, German botanist and physician (b. 1498)
1572 – Cho Shik, Korean poet and scholar (d. 1501)
1590 – Ambrose Dudley, 3rd Earl of Warwick, English nobleman and general (b. 1528)
1595 – Robert Southwell, English priest and poet (b. 1561)

1601–1900
1677 – Baruch Spinoza, Dutch philosopher and scholar (b. 1632)
1715 – Charles Calvert, 3rd Baron Baltimore, English politician (b. 1637)
1730 – Pope Benedict XIII (b. 1649)
1821 – Georg Friedrich von Martens, German jurist and diplomat (b. 1756)
1824 – Eugène de Beauharnais, French general (b. 1781)
1829 – Kittur Chennamma, Indian queen and freedom fighter (b. 1778)
1846 – Emperor Ninkō of Japan (b. 1800)
1862 – Justinus Kerner, German poet and physician (b. 1786)
1888 – William Weston, English-Australian politician, 3rd Premier of Tasmania (b. 1804)
1891 – James Timberlake, American lieutenant and police officer (b. 1846)

1901–present
1919 – Kurt Eisner, German journalist and politician, Minister-President of Bavaria (b. 1867)
1926 – Heike Kamerlingh Onnes, Dutch physicist and academic, Nobel Prize laureate (b. 1853)
1934 – Augusto César Sandino, Nicaraguan rebel leader (b. 1895)
1938 – George Ellery Hale, American astronomer and academic (b. 1868)
1941 – Frederick Banting, Canadian physician and academic, Nobel Prize laureate (b. 1891)
1944 – Ferenc Szisz, Hungarian-French racing driver (b. 1873)
1945 – Eric Liddell, Scottish rugby player and runner (b. 1902)
1946 – José Streel, Belgian journalist (b. 1911)
1947 – Fannie Charles Dillon, American composer (b. 1881)
1958 – Duncan Edwards, English footballer (b. 1936)
1965 – Malcolm X, American minister and activist (b. 1925; assassinated)
1967 – Charles Beaumont, American author and screenwriter (b. 1929)
1968 – Howard Florey, Australian pathologist and pharmacologist, Nobel Prize laureate (b. 1898)
1972 – Zhang Guohua, Chinese general and politician (b. 1914)
  1972   – Bronislava Nijinska, Russian-American dancer and choreographer (b. 1891)
  1972   – Eugène Tisserant, French cardinal (b. 1884)
1974 – Tim Horton, Canadian ice hockey player and businessman, co-founded Tim Hortons (b. 1930)
1980 – Alfred Andersch, German-Swiss author (b. 1914)
1982 – Gershom Scholem, German-Israeli historian and philosopher (b. 1897)
1984 – Mikhail Sholokhov, Russian novelist and short story writer, Nobel Prize laureate (b. 1905)
1985 – Louis Hayward, South African-American actor (b. 1909)
1986 – Helen Hooven Santmyer, American novelist (b. 1895)
1991 – Dorothy Auchterlonie Green, Australian poet, critic, and academic (b. 1915)
  1991   – Nutan, Indian actress (b. 1936)
1993 – Inge Lehmann, Danish seismologist and geophysicist (b. 1888)
1994 – Johannes Steinhoff, German general and pilot (b. 1913)
1995 – Robert Bolt, English dramatist (b. 1924)
1996 – Morton Gould, American pianist, composer, and conductor (b. 1913)
1999 – Gertrude B. Elion, American biochemist and pharmacologist, Nobel Prize laureate (b. 1918)
  1999   – Ilmari Juutilainen, Finnish soldier and pilot (b. 1914)
  1999   – Wilmer Mizell, American baseball player and politician (b. 1930)
2002 – John Thaw, English actor and producer (b. 1942)
2004 – John Charles, Welsh footballer and manager (b. 1931)
2005 – Guillermo Cabrera Infante, Cuban author, screenwriter, and critic (b. 1929)
  2005   – Zdzisław Beksiński, Polish painter, photographer, and sculptor (b. 1929)
2008 – Ben Chapman, American actor (b. 1928)
2011 – Dwayne McDuffie, American author and screenwriter, co-founded Milestone Media (b. 1962)
  2011   – Bernard Nathanson, American physician and activist (b. 1926)
2012 – H. M. Darmstandler, American general (b. 1922)
2013 – Hasse Jeppson, Swedish footballer (b. 1925)
2014 – Héctor Maestri, Cuban-American baseball player (b. 1935)
  2014   – Matthew Robinson, Australian snowboarder (b. 1985)
  2014   – Cornelius Schnauber, German–American historian, playwright, and academic (b. 1939)
2015 – Aleksei Gubarev, Russian general, pilot, and astronaut (b. 1931)
  2015   – Sadeq Tabatabaei, Iranian journalist and politician (b. 1943) 
  2015   – Clark Terry, American trumpet player, composer, and educator (b. 1920)
2016 – Eric Brown, Scottish-English captain and pilot (b. 1919)
2017 – Jeanne Martin Cissé, Guinean teacher and politician (b. 1926)
2018 – Billy Graham, American evangelist (b. 1918)
2019 – Stanley Donen, American film director (b. 1924)	
  2019   – Peter Tork, American musician and actor (b. 1942)
2021 – Mireya Arboleda, Colombian classical pianist (b. 1928)
  2021   – Kevin Dann, Australian rugby league player (b. 1958)

Holidays and observances
Armed Forces Day (South Africa)
Birthday of King Harald V (Norway)
Christian feast day:
Felix of Hadrumetum
Pepin of Landen
Peter Damian
Randoald of Grandval
February 21 (Eastern Orthodox liturgics)
Father Lini Day (Vanuatu)
Language Movement Day (Bangladesh)
International Mother Language Day (UNESCO)
The first day of the Birth Anniversary of Fifth Druk Gyalpo, celebrated until February 23. (Bhutan)
The first day of the Musikahan Festival, celebrated until February 27. (Tagum City, Philippines)

References

Works cited

External links

 BBC: On This Day
 
 Historical Events on February 21

Days of the year
February